Widford is a village and civil parish between Ware and Much Hadham in the East Hertfordshire district of Hertfordshire in England. It covers an area of approximately 1,167 acres and contains 220 houses. The River Ash flows through the north of the parish. Widford had a population of 534 people in the 2011 census.

History 
The name Widford comes from the old English word 'wid' meaning willow tree and the word 'ford'

The Widford commons were extensive and were enclosed under an award of 1856. There was a wood called Lily Wood to the west of the village which was cut down in the late 19th century.

Between 1870 and 1872, John Marius Wilson described Widford as: "a parish, with a village, in Ware district, Herts; near the Buntingford railway, 4 miles E by N of Ware. It has a post-office under Ware, and a r. station."

Demography and employment

The population of Widford was first recorded in 1801 at 361. The population peaked in 1841 at 539. In the most recent census in 2011 the population was measured as 534.

The data included in the graph shows that in 1881 there was one sector of employment that was significantly more popular than any others. This sector was the agriculture sector which had a total of 81 people working in.

Buildings and landmarks 

Widford School is a combination of a primary school and a pre-School. There are approximately 60 pupils with a capacity for a maximum of 8 children per year group. Widford School has been open since 1875.

The Village Hall, on Bell Lane at the south of the civil parish, provides for local individuals and organisations. It was built in 1910 by George S Pawle. The primary use of the hall at inception was as a drill hall for the Hertfordshire Regiment TA; it was then used by a Regiment from Staffordshire. It was for village activities and events before it was bought in 1956, after volunteers raised money to buy the building and renovate it. These volunteers then cared and maintained the hall. A new kitchen was added in 2009. The hall has two main rooms: a function room and a smaller room. The function room has a removable stage and has capacity for 100 people. The smaller room is more of a committee room with capacity for 30 people.

The Widford pub is The Green Man. A local campaign helped keep the pub open after a possible closure.

There is a disused single-platformed railway station in Widford. The station was used between 1873 and 1963 as part of the Ware to Buntingford Branch Line. Construction of the railway began in 1859, and four years later the line was complete and nearly fourteen miles long. A coal and garden product distribution centre uses the site. The railway line is used by walkers and cyclists.

Widford allotments hold more than 20 plots; these were created in 1978 after the land was purchased by Widford Parish Council.

Church 
The parish church is St John the Baptist. The oldest parts of the church date to the early 13th century, with further work in the late 13th and 14th. The church registers, at Hertfordshire County Record Office, date from 1558. The church graveyard was closed for burials in 1903 when a new graveyard on the other side of Ware Road became available. The Church is supported by an independent, non-religious charity called The Friends of Widford Church. The purpose of the charity is to support the parochial church council and to care for the management and maintenance of the church.

Sport and recreation

Playing field 
Widford Playing Field includes a children's play area, a football pitch and a cricket strip. The playing field has green areas of planted trees and hedges. The development of the playing field came after Askey's Field was bought in 1979 by volunteers from the Village Hall Community who raised the money for purchase.

Cricket Club 
The ground of Ware Cricket Club is one of the few privately owned cricket grounds in the country. The club has two teams that compete in the Saracens Hertfordshire Premier Cricket League.

Notable people 
 John Eliot was born in Widford. He was a Puritan missionary to the American Indians He developed an interest in Indian language and translated the Bible into Algonkian which is an American Indian, Algonquian language.
 Arthur Percival who lived in Widford following the end of the Second World War, he was a British Army officer who is best known for his involvement in the Second World War. He commanded the forces of the British Commonwealth during the Battle of Malaya and the subsequent Battle of Singapore.
 Charles Lamb, the author, with his sister of Lamb's Tales from Shakespeare, was a regular visitor to the village when he stayed with his Grandmother Mary Field; her grave can be found in the old churchyard. Mary Field was the housekeeper at the original Blakesware Manor.

See also
 The Hundred Parishes

References

External links
Widford Primary School
Blakesware Manor – Images of England

 
Villages in Hertfordshire
Civil parishes in Hertfordshire
East Hertfordshire District